Gracia Olayo (born 19 August 1957) is a Spanish stage, television and film actress.

Biography 
Gracia Olayo was born in Madrid on 19 August 1957, into a family of 19 siblings. She has another twin sister, Sole Olayo, also an actress. She worked for 11 years (until age 30) as a flight attendant. In 1988, she founded the comedy trio , which became a duo (consisting of Gracia and her twin Sole) in the 1990s. By 1999, she was working in Antena 3's show  as a steward.

She also reprise her role  of Sor Bernarda in the film adaptation of the stage play, La llamada (known under the English-language title Holy Camp!) which was also directed by Los Javis. In 2018 she featured alongside Pedro Casablanc as (foster) parents of the title character of superhero comedy Superlópez. Olayo joined the second season of another superhero comedy work, the series The Neighbor, to portray the Mayor of Madrid, obssessed with bringing a Summer Olympics to the city.

Filmography

Film

Television

Accolades

References 

Spanish stage actresses
Spanish television actresses
Spanish film actresses
20th-century Spanish actresses
21st-century Spanish actresses
Actresses from Madrid

Living people

1957 births